Yamilé Aldama Pozo (born 14 August 1972) is a Cuban-born triple jumper. She represented Cuba until 2003, Sudan from 2004 to 2010, then Great Britain from 2011 onwards. A four-time Olympian (2000–12), she won a silver medal at the 1999 World Championships and a gold medal at the 2012 World Indoor Championships.

Life and career
Aldama was born in Havana, Cuba, and initially represented her country of birth. At first she competed in high jump and heptathlon events, but in 1994 she tried triple jump and two years later qualified for the Olympic team for 1996 Summer Olympics. Unable to compete there due to injury next year she reached the final at the 1997 IAAF World Indoor Championships finishing in sixth place. Two years later she won her only medal to date at the major international final taking silver medal at the 1999 World Championships in Athletics in Seville, Spain. The next year at the 2000 Summer Olympics she finished in fourth position thus cementing her place as an elite triple jumper.

In 2001, she married Andrew Dodds, a Scottish television producer, and thereafter relocated to the United Kingdom. Following her marriage she applied for British citizenship. However, shortly after, her husband was sentenced to 15 years for his part in trafficking heroin valued at £40million. Unconnected to the offence herself, she decided to remain in the United Kingdom with her husband. As she had not lived in Britain before, she had to wait the mandatory three-year period to achieve a passport. She expressed her decision to represent Great Britain at the 2004 Summer Olympics, and was supported by David Moorcroft. Due to this she did not take part in the 2003 World Championships as this would have hindered her chance to switch allegiance to Great Britain.

However, in 2004 the British passport agency refused to push forward her application for a passport. As she moved to Great Britain in November 2001, she would not have been eligible for a passport until November 2004, three months after the Olympics. Aldama instead sought a new country to represent, and after offers from Spain, Italy, and the Czech Republic she instead switched to Sudan.

After acquiring Sudanese citizenship on 23 January 2004, she went to represent Sudan at the 2004 Summer Olympics where she finished in fifth place. In 2004, she also broke the Sudanese triple jump record achieving 15.28 metres. After again taking fourth place at the 2005 World Championships in Athletics she missed the finals at the 2007 and 2009 World Championships as well as the final of 2008 Summer Olympics.

On 5 February 2010, nearly ten years after her initial application, she finally gained British citizenship and a year later, now competing as a Great Britain representative, took fifth-place finish at the 2011 World Championships in Athletics.

On 9 March 2012, at the age of 39 years, Aldama became the IAAF World Indoor Champion in Triple Jump, in Istanbul, Turkey, the second oldest athlete ever to achieve the feat.  In the process, just over five months before her 40th birthday, she improved upon the Masters W35 record twice.  The indoor results have not been ratified as a world record, but later in May she jumped 14.65 at the Rome Diamond League meet to set what is the current record.  On that jump, she landed awkwardly and injured her shoulder. She had to compete in the 2012 Olympics, less than a month short of 40 years old, with the injury still finishing fifth.

At the British Athletics Writers' Association awards in October 2012, Aldama collected the BAWA's 2012 Inspiration award. She also finished third behind winner Jessica Ennis and Christine Ohuruogu in the placings for "British Athlete of the Year".

In January 2013, Aldama made the decision to represent Scotland at the 2014 Commonwealth Games, making her the first athlete to have competed for four different nations. She achieved the feat by participating in this competition, albeit on behalf of England instead.

Achievements

References

External links

 Sports-Reference.com profile for Yamilé Aldama

1972 births
Living people
Athletes from Havana
Cuban female triple jumpers
British female triple jumpers
English female triple jumpers
Sudanese triple jumpers
Sudanese female athletes
Olympic triple jumpers
Olympic athletes of Cuba
Olympic athletes of Great Britain
Olympic athletes of Sudan
Athletes (track and field) at the 2000 Summer Olympics
Athletes (track and field) at the 2004 Summer Olympics
Athletes (track and field) at the 2008 Summer Olympics
Athletes (track and field) at the 2012 Summer Olympics
Pan American Games gold medalists for Cuba
Pan American Games gold medalists in athletics (track and field)
Athletes (track and field) at the 1999 Pan American Games
Commonwealth Games competitors for England
Athletes (track and field) at the 2014 Commonwealth Games
African Games gold medalists for Sudan
African Games gold medalists in athletics (track and field)
Athletes (track and field) at the 2007 All-Africa Games
World Athletics Championships medalists
World Athletics Championships athletes for Sudan
World Athletics Championships athletes for Cuba
World Athletics Championships athletes for Great Britain
Central American and Caribbean Games gold medalists for Cuba
Central American and Caribbean Games medalists in athletics
Competitors at the 1998 Central American and Caribbean Games
World Athletics Indoor Championships winners
British Athletics Championships winners
Sudanese people of Cuban descent
British people of Cuban descent
Naturalised citizens of the United Kingdom
Medalists at the 1999 Pan American Games